Sheila Fearn (born 3 October 1940 in Leicester) is an English retired actress best known for playing Audrey, the sister of Terry Collier in BBC situation comedies The Likely Lads and Whatever Happened to the Likely Lads?, and also later on as Ann Fourmile, the next door neighbour in the Thames Television sitcom George and Mildred.

Early life
Fearn attended Gateway Girls Grammar School on Elbow Lane in Leicester, which closed in 1960.

Career
On film, Fearn appeared in Billy Liar (1963), Catch Us If You Can (1965) and Time Bandits (1981), as well as the film versions of both The Likely Lads (1976) and George and Mildred (1980). Fearn's other television credits include Adam Adamant Lives!, Paul Temple, Crown Court, East of Ipswich by Michael Palin, Emergency – Ward 10, Thriller (1 episode, 1974), Walter, Z-Cars and The Avengers. She also played Freddie, a girlfriend of Ronnie Corbett's character Timothy, in Sorry! She also appeared many times with The Scaffold.

Likely Lads writer Ian La Frenais said of her "she was sexy and funny and she knew John Lennon.  Sheila always found time for everyone, and I now think of her and Audrey with great affection".

Fearn retired from acting in 1988 aged 48 after breaking a leg during a fall from a mountain, leaving her with a prominent limp, which made her believe casting directors would no longer be inclined to employ her.

Filmography

External links

References

1940 births
Living people
People from Leicester
English film actresses
English television actresses
Actresses from Leicestershire